The 2012 National Invitation Tournament was a single-elimination tournament of 32 NCAA Division I teams that were not selected to participate in the 2012 NCAA tournament. The annual tournament began on March 13 on campus sites and ended on March 29 at Madison Square Garden. Stanford defeated Minnesota in the final game, by a score of 75–51 to become NIT champions for second time (first since 1991).

Participants

Automatic qualifiers
The following teams were automatic qualifiers for the 2012 NIT field by virtue of winning their conferences' regular season championship but failing to win their conference tournament. These teams also did not receive an at-large bid for the NCAA Tournament.

At-large bids
The following 21 teams were also awarded NIT berths.

Seeds

Bracket
Played on the home court of the higher-seeded team except #7 seed Iowa hosts #2 seed Dayton since Dayton is the host of the NCAA First Four and cannot host a first-round NIT game.

Semifinals and final
Played at Madison Square Garden in New York City on March 27 and March 29

See also
 2012 Women's National Invitation Tournament
 2012 NCAA Division I men's basketball tournament
 2012 NCAA Division II men's basketball tournament
 2012 NCAA Division III men's basketball tournament
 2012 NCAA Division I women's basketball tournament
 2012 NCAA Division II women's basketball tournament
 2012 NCAA Division III women's basketball tournament
 2012 NAIA Division I men's basketball tournament
 2012 NAIA Division II men's basketball tournament
 2012 NAIA Division I women's basketball tournament
 2012 NAIA Division II women's basketball tournament
 2012 College Basketball Invitational
 2012 CollegeInsider.com Postseason Tournament

References

National Invitation
National Invitation Tournament
2010s in Manhattan
Basketball in New York City
College sports in New York City
Madison Square Garden
National Invitation Tournament
National Invitation Tournament
Sports competitions in New York City
Sports in Manhattan